Central Statistics Office may refer to:

 Central Statistics Office (Afghanistan)
 Central Statistics Office (India)
 Central Statistics Office (Ireland)

See also
 Central Statistical Office (disambiguation)